The coat of arms of Asturias is the official coat of arms of the principality of Asturias, an autonomous community within the kingdom of Spain. It was adopted as such on 27 April 1984.

The oldest attributed arms of the Principality of Asturias date from the 16th century, and show a quartered shield with the castle of the Kingdom of Castile, the lion of León and a goblet. But this Coat of Arms is wrongly attributed to the Prince and the Principality of Asturias, as proved Gaspar Melchor de Jovellanos, author, philosopher and main figure of the Age of Enlightenment in Spain.
This Coat of Arms appeared in printed books and maps, even It was included in the Encyclopédie of Denis Diderot.

Description

The arms consist of a field of azure with the Victory Cross of Or adorned by gemstones. The cross is the symbol of the re-conquest of Spain from the Moors. The cross was used, according to the legend or tradition, by the local Visigothic governor Pelagius of Asturias, in the initial battles against the Moors. It was claimed that the cross had brought victory, and it was later gold-plated. However, there is no historical evidence that Pelayo used exactly this same cross.

The Greek letters of alpha and omega are suspended from the left and right bars, respectively. Accompanying the cross is the legend : "This sign safeguards the pious. This sign conquers the enemy." 

The arms are "ensigned of a Spanish Royal Crown".

Usage
In 1985 a simplified version of the shield was legislated for exclusive use in the Administration of the Principality. 

The arms must appear de jure in:
Documents that contain the Laws of the General Meeting that the President of the Principality of Asturias in name of the King of Spain promulgates.
Documents, forms, seals and letterheads of official use of the autonomous community.
Official publications by the Principality of Asturias.
Official symbols used by the authorities of the autonomous community.
Diplomas or titles of any class sent by authorities of the autonomous community.
Buildings and establishments of the Asturian autonomous community according to the law that regulates it, the shield cannot be used as a symbol of identification by any other public or deprived institution that is not the Principality of Asturias. Any use is not admitted that goes in reduction of its high meaning.

One stays the existing shields in those declared buildings historical-artistic monuments. Also those that appear in those others that they form substantial part of the ornato and decoration. 

The Shield of the Principality enjoys the same degree of protection as that of the other symbols of Spain.

Gallery

See also 
Flag of Asturias

Notes

References
 
 
 

 
Asturian culture
Asturias
Asturias
Asturias